The 2002 Daytona 500, the 44th running of the event, was held on February 17 at Daytona International Speedway in Daytona Beach, Florida as the first of 36 races of the 2002 Winston Cup Season. Rookie Jimmie Johnson, driving the No. 48 Chevrolet for Hendrick Motorsports, won the pole with fellow Daytona 500 rookie Kevin Harvick qualifying second, making this the first time the field would be led by two first-time Daytona 500 participants. Ward Burton, driving the No.22 Dodge for Bill Davis Racing, won the race. This race was the last for long-time veteran driver Dave Marcis.

As part of the television contract signed at the end of the 1999 NASCAR season, the 2002 Daytona 500 was televised by NBC. Allen Bestwick provided the play-by-play in the booth with color commentators Benny Parsons and Wally Dallenbach Jr. The prerace show was hosted by Bill Weber, who reported from the pits with Matt Yocum, Marty Snider, and Dave Burns. This was the first time NBC televised the Daytona 500.

Background

The 2002 Daytona 500 was the first of 36 scheduled stock car races of the 2002 NASCAR Winston Cup Series, and the 44th running of the event. It was held on February 17, 2002, in Daytona Beach, Florida, at Daytona International Speedway, one of six superspeedways to hold NASCAR races; the others are Michigan International Speedway, Auto Club Speedway, Indianapolis Motor Speedway, Pocono Raceway, and Talladega Superspeedway. Its standard track is a four-turn, 2.5-mile (4.0 km) superspeedway. Daytona's turns are banked at 31 degrees, and the front stretch—the location of the finish line—is banked at 18 degrees.

The Daytona 500 was conceived by NASCAR founder Bill France Sr., who built the Daytona International Speedway. The race was first held in 1959; it is the successor to shorter races held on beaches around Daytona Beach. It has been the opening round of the NASC AR season since 1982, and from 1988, it has been one of four events that require cars to run restrictor plates. The Daytona 500 is often regarded as NASCAR's most prestigious race because it offers the most prize money in American auto racing. Victory is considered equal to winning either the World Series, the Super Bowl or The Masters. The race is often called the "Great American Race" or the "Super Bowl of Stock Car Racing".

In preparation for the race, NASCAR scheduled several test sessions on January 7–9 (for teams who finished in an odd-number position in the 2002 car owner points standings) and January 14–16, 2002 (for teams who finished in an even-number position in the 2002 car owner points standings). Every test session began at 9 a.m. EST, stopped at 12:00 – 1:00 p.m. EST, and concluded at 5:00 p.m. EST. The January 14 test sessions were cancelled due to rain; NASCAR officials elongated testing to January 17.

Pre-race regulation changes 
For the race, NASCAR mandated a series of rules regarding the aerodynamics of the cars.

Later, NASCAR installed an additional template on each of the four types of vehicle in an attempt to ensure the spoiler is positioned correctly.

In other changes, NASCAR permitted teams to switch engines between the qualifying session and the race in an exception to its cost-cutting regulation mandating each team to use one engine per race weekend because of the Daytona 500 race format having two qualifying races to determine the majority of its starting order.

Practice and qualifying

Eight practice sessions were scheduled before the Sunday race. The first two were held on February 8 and lasted 120 and 110 minutes each. The next two on February 11 and 12 were shortened to 105 minutes. On February 13, two 45 minute practice sessions were scheduled. A session lasting 60 minutes was held the following day. The final practice session, scheduled for February 16, was cancelled because of rain. In the first practice session, Johnson was fastest with a lap of 48.639 seconds, ahead of his Hendrick Motorsports teammates Jeff Gordon and Jerry Nadeau in second and third. Ricky Rudd, Ward Burton, Dale Jarrett, Robert Pressley, Mike Wallace, Bill Elliott, and Kevin Harvick made up positions four to ten. Johnson led the second practice session later that day with a 48.685 seconds time. Rudd, Gordon, Ward Burton, Nadeau, Terry Labonte, Jarrett, Dale Earnhardt Jr., Johnny Benson Jr. and Waltrip rounded out the top ten drivers.

54 cars entered first-round qualifying on February 9; due to NASCAR's qualifying procedure only 43 could race. Unlike most races during the season, the qualifying session determined the first two position, while the rest of the field qualified by the 2002 Gatorade 125s. Each driver was limited to two timed laps, with the starting order determined by the competitor's fastest times. Johnson was the fourth driver to venture onto the track; he took the maiden pole position of his career, and his first in a NASCAR-sanctioned event since he debuted in the series at the 1998 Busch Series, with a time of 48.431 seconds. He became the third rookie driver in history to claim pole position for the Daytona 500 after Loy Allen Jr. in the 1994 event and Skinner in the 1997 race. Johnson was joined on the grid's front row by Harvick who was sixteen-thousands of a second slower, after a driver error in the third and fourth turns on his second lap. This meant for the first time in history, the Daytona 500 featured two rookie drivers starting in the first two grid positions. After qualifying, Johnson said, "We've shown our hand during testing and practice. We didn't want to fool ourselves into thinking we had a magic three- or four-tenths hidden somewhere. We thought that some other guys had an ace in their back pockets, and we didn't expect Kevin Harvick to jump up there."

After the qualifying session, NASCAR vice-president of communications Jim Hunter stated no regulation changes would be considered until after the qualifying races.

In the third practice session, Geoff Bodine went fastest with a lap of 47.776 seconds, ahead of Dave Blaney in second and Rudd third. Sterling Marlin was fourth-fastest, with Jeff Burton fifth and Dave Marcis sixth. Harvick, Greg Biffle, Ken Schrader, and Bobby Hamilton followed in the top ten. Second round qualifying was held during the afternoon on February 11 to allow drivers to improve their fastest times or set a lap in the event they were not able to in first round qualifying; the session's fastest driver, placing 27th-fastest was Kyle Petty, qualifying fastest of the four competitors who were in the session. Skinner, Norm Benning, and Kirk Shelmerdine were the three other drivers who competed in the session.

Mark Martin led the fourth practice session with a time of 47.933 seconds, with Johnson, Rusty Wallace, Benson, Jeff Burton, Jarrett, Elliott Sadler, John Andretti, Nadeau and Biffle in positions two to ten. With ten minutes of the session remaining, Brett Bodine experienced understeer exiting the second corner, causing him to slow in a plethora of cars, and drift up the circuit. Hamilton, who was close by Bodine, made contact with the latter's left-rear quarter panel, turning Hamilton into Todd Bodine. That caused a chain reaction accident involving Tony Stewart, Jeff Burton, Jimmy Spencer, and Rudd. Hamilton, Jeff Burton and Todd Bodine ventured to the infield medical center, and were released after precautionary check-ups. Hamilton and Todd Bodine switched to back-up cars for the Gatorade 125s. Casey Atwood topped the fifth practice session with a 47.342 seconds lap. Elliott Sadler, Hermie Sadler, Marlin, Kenny Wallace, Shawna Robinson, Robby Gordon, Spencer, Mayfield, and Todd Bodine placed in second to tenth positions. A lap of 47.721 seconds gave Elliott the lead in the sixth session; Compton, Benson, Blaney, Andretti, Matt Kenseth, Hamilton, Brett Bodine, Waltrip and Sadler rounded out the session's top ten drivers.

Gordon and Waltrip were the winners of the Gatorade 125s. The qualifying grid was finalized with Gordon third and Waltrip fourth. Earnhardt qualified fifth, ahead of Stewart, Schrader, Nadeau, Rudd, and Bobby Labonte. By qualifying for the race, Marcis broke Richard Petty's all-time record of 32 Daytona 500 starts with his 33rd, as Robinson became the second woman to progress to the race, and the first since Janet Guthrie at the 1980 edition. The eleven drivers who failed to qualify were Spencer, Hut Stricklin, Buckshot Jones, Biffle, Rick Mast, Bobby Gerhart, Hermie Sadler, Carl Long, Benning, Shelmerdine, and Dwayne Leik. In the final practice session, Harvick was fastest with a lap of 47.588 seconds; Sadler and Terry Labonte were second and third. Kurt Busch, Rudd, Andretti, Ricky Craven, Brett Bodine, Robby Gordon and Rusty Wallace followed in positions four to ten. Craven's engine failed as he was drafting Jarrett, prompting the latter to steer right to avoid a collision, and causing a four-car accident involving Petty, Terry Labonte, Marcis, and Brett Bodine on the backstretch.

Race summary
The drama started almost immediately as one of the pre-race favourites, shootout winner Tony Stewart, blew an engine on just the third lap. The race's first caution flew as another favourite,  Dale Earnhardt Jr., ran over debris and cut a front right tire in turn 1 on lap 23 while running in second-place. He then staged a furious charge back into top 10 with a new nose after the tire tore up the right-front fender. Dave Marcis’ final Winston Cup start was brought to an end on lap 79 due to engine trouble, bringing out the second caution of the day. Just before halfway, Earnhardt Jr. got into more trouble when he this time lost a rear tire in turn 4, then ended up driving through the infield grass as he tried to get onto pit road as the flailing rubber had damaged a brake line. This brought out a third caution. On the following restart, Brett Bodine spun off of Kenny Wallace's bumper, and the yellow flag came back out for the fourth time.

On lap 138, rookie Shawna Robinson and Mike Skinner tangled exiting turn 2, bringing out the fifth caution of the day. But the course of the race took a twist on lap 148 when contact between Jeff Gordon and Kevin Harvick triggered the "Big One". The pair were battling for second place, when Harvick attempted to block Gordon on the approach to turn 1, but it came too late and the 29 car first jinked left down onto the apron, before spinning back across the track and collecting a number of cars. A total of 18 cars were caught up in the wreck, the same number of cars collected in the 2001 Daytona 500's Big One. These included Matt Kenseth, Ricky Rudd, Joe Nemechek, Ken Schrader, Jeremy Mayfield, John Andretti, Bobby Hamilton, Jerry Nadeau and Earnhardt Jr. (his third incident of the race) amongst others.

Polesitter Jimmie Johnson’s chances of victory were dashed on lap 173 when he blew a tire exiting the tri-oval towards turn 1. His car bounced off Jeff Green, spun through the infield grass and slid back across the track in a similar manner to Harvick's, although luckily this time there were no cars behind him when the car rejoined the track. Although he kept the car off the wall, he was forced to pit for repairs and would eventually finish a lap down in 15th. The eighth caution of the day flew when Robby Gordon was spun coming off turn 2, setting up what appeared to be a 6-lap showdown to the finish, with defending cup champion and two-time 500 winner Jeff Gordon leading fellow two-time winner Sterling Marlin.

As the field came down to the green, chaos ensued. A chain reaction began between the eighth and ninth positions after one driver missed a gear. Five cars were involved, including the defending Daytona 500 winner Michael Waltrip, who spun towards the pits and nearly hit the pace car being driven by Jay Leno. Up front, Marlin got a run on Gordon exiting the tri-oval, and managed to get his nose underneath the 24 car. Gordon threw a late block and spun across the nose of the Dodge, in almost a carbon copy of the incident between him and Harvick. Despite smoke caused by a damaged front right fender, Marlin beat Ward Burton back to the caution flag and maintained the lead, while Gordon rejoined at the tail of the lead lap. Rather than have the race finish under caution, the officials stopped the field on the backstretch so the track could be cleared by course officials and the drivers could race to the finish.

Concerned about damage on his right front fender, Marlin got out of his car and tried to pull the fender away from the tire while the cars were stopped, and was told to stop by pace car driver Buster Auton. NASCAR deemed Marlin to be in breach of the rule forbidding any repair work during a red flag. When the cars restarted and pulled away under yellow, NASCAR penalized Marlin by sending him to the rear of the field.

Burton inherited the lead for the 3-lap shootout, followed by fellow Virginia native Elliott Sadler and 1986 race winner Geoffrey Bodine. These three would remain pretty much single file to the finish, while a further eleven cars set about a frantic scrap from fourth on back. 3-time 500 winner Dale Jarrett collided with Mark Martin upon taking the white flag and became yet another car to be sent spinning through the grass entering turn 1. Burton held off Sadler to claim the win, with Bodine finishing third just two years after a crash that nearly took his life in the Craftsman Truck Series' Daytona 250 at the same racetrack. Kurt Busch prevailed in the mad scrap for fourth, followed by Waltrip, Martin, top rookie Ryan Newman, the recovering cars of Marlin and Gordon, and Johnny Benson Jr.

Burton's Daytona 500 win was the first for Dodge since Richard Petty's win in the 1974 race.
This was Phoenix Racing's best finish until Brad Keselowski won the 2009 Aaron's 499 at Talladega.
As of 2017, this has been the only Daytona 500 to feature more than one trio of brothers. All three Bodine brothers (Geoff, Brett, and Todd) had started the Daytona 500 together, as had all three Wallace brothers (Rusty, Mike, and Kenny), but never all three brothers from both families in the same year.

Results

Notes and references

Notes

References

External links

Daytona 500
Daytona 500
Daytona 500
NASCAR races at Daytona International Speedway